"Visiting Hours" is a song by English singer-songwriter Ed Sheeran. It was released on 19 August 2021 as the promotional single from his fourth studio album, =, the same day he announced the album. The song was produced by Sheeran and Johnny McDaid.

Background and release
On 2 March 2021, Australian music promoter Michael Gudinski died at the age of 68. Sheeran first performed "Visiting Hours" at Gudinski's funeral on 24 March 2021 as a tribute to him in Australia, delivering an emotional performance. Gudinski's close friends and fellow musicians, Kylie Minogue and Jimmy Barnes, as well as comedian Jimmy Carr, provide backing vocals on the song. He finished the song during his two weeks of mandatory quarantine because of COVID-19 rules due to his decision to travel to Australia. On 19 August 2021, Sheeran released the song as a promotional single and announced the album. A live performance video, which was filmed in St. Stephen's Church in Hampstead, London, was also released with the song. Sheeran stated that he "finished writing this song going through proper grief for the first time, and for me its one of the most important songs on =".

Lyrics
Lyrically, "Visiting Hours" is an ode to the late Michael Gudinski, an Australian music promoter. In the first verse, Sheeran makes a reference to his daughter, Lyra Seaborn Sheeran, wishing that Gudinski had got to meet her: "I wish that Heaven had visiting hours / So I could just show up and bring the news / That she's getting older and I wish that you'd met her / The things that she'll learn from me, I got them all from you".

Credits and personnel
Credits adapted from Tidal.

 Ed Sheeran – vocals, songwriting, production
 Johnny McDaid – production, songwriting, engineering, backing vocals
 Parisi – additional production
 Josh McDaid – backing vocals
 Courteney Cox - backing vocals
 Aine McDaid – backing vocals
 Pauline McDaid – backing vocals
 Maev McDaid – backing vocals
 Kylie Minogue – backing vocals
 Jimmy Barnes – backing vocals
 Jimmy Carr – backing vocals
 Ant Clemons – songwriting
 Michael Pollack – songwriting
 Amy Wadge – songwriting
 Scott Carter – songwriting
 Kim Lang Smith – songwriting
 Graham Archer – engineering
 Will Reynolds – engineering assistant
 Spike Stent – mixing
 Charlie Holmes – mixing assistant
 Kieran Beardmore – mixing assistant
 Matt Wolach – mixing assistant
 Stuart Hawkes – mastering

Charts

Certifications

References

2021 singles
2021 songs
Ed Sheeran songs
Folk ballads
Pop ballads
Songs about business people
Commemoration songs
Song recordings produced by Ed Sheeran
Songs written by Amy Wadge
Songs written by Ant Clemons
Songs written by Ed Sheeran
Songs written by Johnny McDaid
Songs written by Michael Pollack (musician)